The Philosophical Quarterly is a quarterly academic journal of philosophy established in 1950 and published by Wiley-Blackwell on behalf of the Scots Philosophical Club and the University of St Andrews. Since 2014 its publisher is Oxford Academic. Every year the journal holds an Essay Prize. The journal is  considered one of the top-ten publication venues in general philosophy.

Notable articles
 "Extreme and Restricted Utilitarianism" (1956) - J.J.C. Smart
 "Rawls’ Theory of Justice" (1973) - R.M. Hare
 "Epiphenomenal Qualia" (1982) - Frank Jackson
 "De Re Senses" (1984) - John McDowell
 "Jackson on Physical Information and Qualia" - Terrance Horgan
 "Dispositions and Conditionals" (1994) - C. B. Martin
 "The Content of Perceptual Experience" (1994) - John McDowell
 "Are We Living in a Computer Simulation?" (2003) - Nick Bostrom

References

External links
 
 The Scots Philosophical Club

Philosophy journals
Wiley-Blackwell academic journals
Publications established in 1950
Quarterly journals
English-language journals
Contemporary philosophical literature
1950 establishments in Scotland